The  Tulsa Talons season was the 12th season for the franchise, and the second in the Arena Football League. The team was coached by Mitch Allner and played their home games at BOK Center. The Talons finished the season 8–10, failing to qualify for the playoffs. This would be the last season for the Talons in Tulsa, Oklahoma. The franchise relocated to San Antonio, Texas following this season.

Standings

Regular season schedule
The season opener for the Talons was on the road against the Georgia Force on March 13. Their first home game was on March 28 against the Arizona Rattlers. They visited the Kansas City Command in their final regular season game.

Regular season

Week 1: at Georgia Force

Week 2: at Dallas Vigilantes

Week 3: vs. Arizona Rattlers

Week 4: at Pittsburgh Power

Week 5: BYE

Week 6: vs. San Jose SaberCats

Week 7: vs. Iowa Barnstormers

Week 8: at Cleveland Gladiators

Week 9: vs. Chicago Rush

Week 10: at New Orleans VooDoo

Week 11: vs. Kansas City Command

Week 12: at Chicago Rush

Week 13: BYE

Week 14: vs. Utah Blaze

Week 15: at Philadelphia Soul

Week 16: vs. Dallas Vigilantes

Week 17: at Iowa Barnstormers

Week 18: vs. Tampa Bay Storm

Week 19: vs. Orlando Predators

Week 20: at Kansas City Command

References

Tulsa Talons
San Antonio Talons seasons